The Seekers were an Australian folk music group formed in 1962 consisting of Athol Guy, Keith Potger, Bruce Woodley and Judith Durham. 

The quartet were first active from 1962 to 1968 when Durham left to pursue a solo career. The group re-formed in 1975 and recruited Louisa Wisseling to provide vocals, but disbanded again in 1978. In 1988, the group re-formed with Julie Anthony and then (from 1990-91) Karen Knowles providing vocals. In 1993, Durham reunited with original members Guy, Potger and Woodley, and they have toured on and off since then. 

Below is an extensive discography of their hits across the world, where they scored numerous successes in countries such as Australia, New Zealand, United Kingdom and the United States.

Albums

Studio albums

Live albums

Compilation albums

Other official compilation albums
 More of the Fabulous Seekers (1968)
 Seekers Golden Collection (1969)
 The Seekers (1969)
 The Sound of the Seekers (1970)
 The Seekers Again (1973)
 25 Favourites (1973)
 The Very Best of the Seekers (1974)
 The Second Album of the Very Best of The Seekers (1975)
 Collector Series – The Seekers (1977)
 The Very Best of The Seekers (1978) 
 All Around the World (1978)
 24 Golden Greats (1978)
 This Is The Seekers (1980)
 The Hits of The Seekers (1983)
 Greatest Hits (1985)
 An Hour of The Seekers (1988)
 Ideal (1990)
 Capitol Collectors Series (1992)
 This Is The Seekers (1994)
 Collection (1998)
 The Very Best of The Seekers (1998)
 The Ultimate Collection (2003)
 A's, B's & EP's (2004)
 The Ultimate Collection (2007)
 We Wish You a Merry Christmas (2019)

Box sets

Singles

References

External Links
 

Discographies of Australian artists
Pop music group discographies
Folk music discographies
Discography